Jakub Szczepaniak (born 20 May 2003) is a Polish footballer who plays as a defender for Olimpia Grudziądz.

Career statistics

Club

Notes

References 

2003 births
Living people
People from Grudziądz
Polish footballers
Association football defenders
Olimpia Grudziądz players
I liga players